Prääma is a village in Paide Parish, Järva County in northern-central Estonia. It is located just north of Paide. As of 2007, it had a population of 32 people.

References

Villages in Järva County
Kreis Jerwen